Hours of Work (Commerce and Offices) Convention, 1930 is  an International Labour Organization Convention.

It was established in 1930:
Having decided upon the adoption of certain proposals with regard to the regulations of hours of work in commerce and offices,...

Ratifications
As of 2013, the convention had been ratified by 30 states. Two of the ratifying states—Finland and New Zealand—have subsequently denounced the treaty.

See also 
Hours of Work (Industry) Convention, 1919

External links 
Text.
Ratifications.

International Labour Organization conventions
Working time
Treaties concluded in 1930
Treaties entered into force in 1933
Treaties of Argentina
Treaties of Bolivia
Treaties of the Kingdom of Bulgaria
Treaties of Chile
Treaties of Colombia
Treaties of Cuba
Treaties of the United Arab Republic
Treaties of Equatorial Guinea
Treaties of the First Austrian Republic
Treaties of Ghana
Treaties of Guatemala
Treaties of Haiti
Treaties of the Iraqi Republic (1958–1968)
Treaties of Israel
Treaties of Kuwait
Treaties of Lebanon
Treaties of Luxembourg
Treaties of Mexico
Treaties of Morocco
Treaties of the People's Republic of Mozambique
Treaties of Nicaragua
Treaties of Norway
Treaties of Panama
Treaties of Paraguay
Treaties of Saudi Arabia
Treaties of the Second Spanish Republic
Treaties of Uruguay
1930 in labor relations